Žan Zaletel (born 16 September 1999) is a Slovenian footballer who plays as a defender for Danish Superliga side Viborg FF.

Club career
Zaletel made his Slovenian PrvaLiga debut for Celje on 20 July 2018 in a game against Aluminij.

References

External links
 
 Žan Zaletel at NZS 

1999 births
Living people
Slovenian footballers
Slovenia youth international footballers
Slovenia under-21 international footballers
Slovenian expatriate footballers
Association football defenders
NK Bravo players
NK Celje players
Viborg FF players
Slovenian Second League players
Slovenian PrvaLiga players
Danish Superliga players
Slovenian expatriate sportspeople in Denmark
Expatriate men's footballers in Denmark